St. Paul's University,  is a private Christian ecumenical University with its main campus in Limuru, Kiambu County Kenya. The students and staff of the University come from all over the world.

Accreditation 
It acquired the status of university, on September 14, 2007 and the University was awarded a Charter to become St. Paul's University.

Academics

Postgraduate Program

Doctorate Programmes 

 Doctor of Philosophy in Business Administration and Management
 Doctor of Philosophy in Development Studies
 Doctor of Philosophy in Theology

Masters' Programmes 

 Master of Arts in Communication Studies
 Master of Arts in Community Care & HIV/AIDS
 Masters of Arts in Counselling Psychology
 Master of Arts in Islam and Christian-Muslim Relations
 Master of Arts in Sociology
 Master of Arts in Transformational Leadership
 Master of Business Administration
 Master of Development Studies
 Master of Education (Early Childhood Studies)
 Master of Procurement and Logistics Management
 Master of Public Administration and Policy
 Masters in Theology

Undergraduate Programmes 

 Bachelor of Arts in Communication
 Bachelor of Arts in Community Development
 Bachelor of Arts in Counseling Psychology
 Bachelor of Arts in Criminal Justice and Security Studies
 Bachelor of Arts in Leadership and Management
 Bachelor of Arts in Peace and Conflict Studies
 Bachelor of Arts in Social Work
 Bachelor of Business Administration & Management
 Bachelor of Business and Information Technology
 Bachelor of Commerce
 Bachelor of Computer Science
 Bachelor of Divinity
 Bachelor of Education (Arts)
 Bachelor of Education (Special Needs)
 Bachelor of Education Education In Early Childhood Development and Education (ECDE)
 Bachelor of Science in Computing and Information Systems
 Bachelor of Science in Nursing (Regular)
 Bachelor of Science in Health Records Management and Informatics
 Bachelor of Science in Health Systems Management and Economics
 Bachelor of Translation Studies

Diploma Programmes 

 Diploma in Business Information Technology (DBIT)
 Diploma in Business Management
 Diploma in Clinical Medicine and Surgery
 Diploma in Communication
 Diploma in Community Development
 Diploma in Community Health Development
 Diploma in Computer Science
 Diploma in Counseling Psychology
 Diploma in Criminology and Security Management
 Diploma in Education (Arts)
 Diploma in Film Production
 Diploma in Health Records Management
 Diploma in Hotel and Catering Management
 Diploma in Information Technology
 Diploma in Journalism
 Diploma in Leadership and Management
 Diploma in Music
 Diploma in Peace Building and Conflict Resolution
 Diploma in Public Relations
 Diploma in Social Work
 Diploma in Theology

Location 
St. Paul’s University Main Campus in Kenya is located in Limuru. It is strategically located in the lush Kiambu County along Nairobi-Limuru Route A, approximately 30 km from Nairobi area near Nairobi city. Its other campuses are located in Nairobi, Nakuru and Machakos.

References

St. Paul's University, Limuru

Private universities and colleges in Kenya
Kiambu County
Christian education in Kenya
Christian universities and colleges